Mosul is a 2019 American war documentary film about the battle to reclaim the Iraqi city of Mosul from the Islamic State of Iraq and the Levant (ISIL) from 2016 to 2017.

Overview
The film is the directorial debut from Dan Gabriel, who worked in the region as a CIA counter-terrorism officer, and also produced the film. The film focuses on the intersecting narratives of the various Iraqi ethnic groups that were involved in the operation: Sunni tribesman, Shiite militias, Christian fighters, and Kurdish Peshmerga forces. The eyewitness footage was captured over nine months by a camera crew embedded with various units of the Iraqi forces. The film follows Iraqi journalist Ali Maula who is embedded with the militia, along with war widow Um Hanadi, and ISIS recruiter Nasser Issa. Others that appear in footage of Maula's interviews include Captain Alaa Atah of the Iraqi Emergency Response Brigade and Sheikh "The Crocodile" Saleh.

Release
Mosul premiered at the 2019 Cleveland International Film Festival. The official release date for digital distribution is May 14, 2019, by Gravitas Ventures. The film's original score was composed by Grammy-nominated British record producer Photek. The documentary is 86 minutes long. The original score was written by Photek.

Reception
On Rotten Tomatoes the film has an approval rating of  based on reviews from  critics.

Film Inquiry wrote, "Gritty, powerful and honest, the film begs to be experienced, discussed, and remembered." Michael Rechtshaffen of the Los Angeles Times said "while not exactly uncharted documentary territory, the Iraq conflict is thought-provokingly portrayed in 'Mosul'." Laura DeMarco called the film "a gripping narrative of life during 'total warfare'."

References

External links
 
 

2019 films
2019 documentary films
American documentary films
Documentary films about jihadism
Films scored by Photek
2010s American films